Self-portrait is a painting by the Finnish artist Vilho Lampi (1898–1936) from 1933.

The painting measures 47 × 36.5 centimeters. It has been in the Ateneum in Helsinki since 1934.

Vilho Lampi created several self-portraits. In this image the artist is sitting at a table and smoking a cigarette.

Other self-portraits by Vilho Lampi

References 

1933 paintings
Finnish paintings
Self-portraits
Paintings in the collection of the Ateneum